Deane Winston Hutton (born 30 April 1941) is an Australian television presenter and futurist. His work on television has included 18 years as a co-writer-presenter with 
Rob Morrison of the Curiosity Show,
and as science presenter on Hey Hey It's Saturday.
Hutton has also presented science reports on the Sunday editions of Seven News in Adelaide and had some segments on the ABC show The New Inventors.
Hutton also produced Christian science videos.

Publications

Hutton has written or co-written at least ten books on science and natural history, including:
 Hutton, D.W. & Morrison, R.G.B. (1980). Exploring your world:  Air  Brisbane: Jacaranda Wiley. 
 Hutton, D.W. & Morrison, R.G.B. (1980). Exploring your world:  Earth  Brisbane: Jacaranda Wiley. 
 Hutton, D.W. & Morrison, R.G.B. (1980). Exploring your world:  Water  Brisbane: Jacaranda Wiley. 
 Hutton, D.W. & Morrison, R.G.B. (1980). Exploring your world:  Fire  Brisbane: Jacaranda Wiley. 
 Hutton, D.W. & Morrison, R.G.B. (1980). Super mindstretchers  Gosford: Ashton Scholastic. 
 
 Hutton, D.W. & Morrison, R.G.B. (1984). What happens when ..... Brisbane:  Jacaranda Press. 
 Hutton, D.W. & Morrison, R.G.B. (1985). What happens ... and why?  Brisbane:  Jacaranda Press. 
 Hutton, D.W. & Morrison, R.G.B. (1985). Arrow book of things to make and do, Gosford:  Ashton Scholastic. 
 Hutton, D.W. & Morrison, R.G.B. (1986). Let's experiment, Brisbane:  Jacaranda Press.

References 

Australian television presenters
Futurologists
Living people
1941 births